Nora Platiel (14 January 1896 in Bochum – 5 September 1979 in Kassel) was a Social Democratic politician, lawyer and resistance fighter against Nazism. Platiel received the Grand Cross of Merit of the Federal Republic of Germany.

References

1896 births
1979 deaths
People from Bochum
German resistance members
20th-century German lawyers
German social democrats
20th-century German politicians
Commanders Crosses of the Order of Merit of the Federal Republic of Germany